Major Atmospheric Cerenkov Experiment Telescope (MACE) is an Imaging Atmospheric Cerenkov telescope (IACT) located near Hanle, Ladakh, India. It is the highest (in altitude) and second largest Cerenkov telescope in the world. It was built by Electronics Corporation of India, Hyderabad, for the Bhabha Atomic Research Centre and was assembled at the campus of Indian Astronomical Observatory at Hanle. It was originally scheduled to become operational by 2016, but plans were pushed back to begin operations in 2020. It will be remotely operated and will run on solar power.

The telescope is the second-largest gamma ray telescope in the world and will help the scientific community enhance its understanding in the fields of astrophysics, fundamental physics, and particle acceleration mechanisms. The largest telescope of the same class is the 28-metre-diameter High Energy Stereoscopic System (HESS) telescope being operated in Namibia.

Description
The telescope is named after the Soviet scientist Pavel Cherenkov, who predicted that charged particles moving at high speeds in a medium emit light. The high-energy gamma rays emitted from black holes, centers of galaxies and pulsars do not reach the land as they get absorbed in the atmosphere. Upon interaction with the atmosphere, these photons produce electron–positron pairs, leading to a cascade of particles which while moving at very high speed give rise to Cerenkov radiation.

Very-high-energy (VHE) gamma rays offer a unique insight into some of the most extreme phenomena of the universe. Detection of celestial VHE gamma rays allows the study of exotic objects like pulsars, pulsar wind nebulae, super nova remnants, micro-quasars, active galactic nuclei etc. where particles are accelerated to TeV (1012 eV) energies and beyond. These exceptionally energetic photons are detected on the Earth by an indirect process which uses the Earth's atmosphere as a transducer. The Cherenkov light is beamed around the direction of the incident gamma ray and covers an area of around 50,000 square meters on the ground. This effective area is far larger in magnitude than the area of satellite instruments used for detecting gamma rays directly. To detect these flashes of Cherenkov light, photomultiplier tube cameras are used at the focus of large tracking light collectors. The intensity of the image recorded by the telescope is related to the energy of the incident gamma ray photon.

The MACE Telescope consists of a large-area tessellated light collector of 356 m², made up of 356 mirror panels. A high-resolution imaging camera weighing about 1200 kg, for detection and characterization of the atmospheric Cherenkov events, forms the focal plane instrumentation of the telescope. The elevation over azimuth mounted telescope basket structure has two axes movement capability of ± 270° in azimuth and -26° to +165° in elevation for pointing towards any source in the sky and tracking it. The telescope, which weighs about 180 tons, is supported on six wheels which move on a 27-metre-diameter track.

The telescope has an integrated imaging camera, which contains 1088 photo multiplier-based pixels and all the signal processing and data acquisition electronics. The camera communicates the acquired data to the computer system in the control room over optical fiber.

The main features of the telescope include safe and secure operation of the telescope remotely from anywhere in the world, and its structure is designed to operate in winds of speed up to 30 km/h and retain its structural integrity in the parking position in winds of speed up to 150 km/h.

Specifications
 Built by: Electronics Corporation of India, Hyderabad
 Location: Hanle, Ladakh
 Length: 21 meters
 Weight: 180 metric tons
 Azimuth: −270° to +270°
 Elevation: −26° to +165°
 Area: 356 m²
 Energy range: 20 to 100 GeV and also beyond 5 TeV
  Altitude: 4,500 m above the mean sea level.

See also
 Indian Astronomical Observatory
 List of highest astronomical observatories
 Lists of telescopes
 Gamma-ray astronomy

References

External links 
 

Astronomical observatories in India
Space programme of India
Research institutes in Jammu and Kashmir
Buildings and structures in Ladakh
Leh district
Science and technology in Ladakh
Buildings and structures under construction in India